Hovorodon is a genus of beetles in the family Cerambycidae. It was established in 2010 by division of the genus Nothopleurus and contains the following species:

 Hovorodon bituberculatum (Palisot de Beauvois, 1805)
 Hovorodon maxillosum (Drury, 1773)
 Hovorodon santacruzensis (Hovore & Santos-Silva, 2004)
 Hovorodon subcancellatum (Thomson, 1867)

References

Prioninae